Khaltesh-Anki is the Ob Ugrian Khanty/Mansi goddess of the earth.

External links
 On the Sacrificial Ritual of the Pim River Khanty in December 1995
 MOS'-WOMAN
 Mäetagused vol. 3

Siberian deities
Earth goddesses